Kiteboarding competitions at the 2019 World Beach Games in Doha, Qatar were held from 13 to 16 October 2019.

Medal summary

Medal table

Medalists

Participating nations

External links
Results book

2019 World Beach Games events
2019 in sailing